XHOCA-FM is a radio station on 89.7 FM in Oaxaca, Oaxaca, serving the capital city of Oaxaca de Juárez. It is owned by Grupo ACIR and carries its Amor romantic music format.

History

XHOCA received its concession in October 1992; the concession was originally awarded to José Antonio Ibarra Fariña, part of the Ibarra family that founded Grupo ACIR.

In 2017, XHOCA picked up the Amor format previously on XHIU-FM 105.7, ditching the grupera La Comadre format.

References

Radio stations in Oaxaca City
Grupo ACIR
Radio stations established in 1992
1992 establishments in Mexico